Kevin Thomas Moore (29 April 1958 – 29 April 2013) was an English professional footballer.

Born in Grimsby, Lincolnshire, he played for Grimsby Town, Oldham Athletic, Southampton, Bristol Rovers and Fulham. Moore is one of five members of his family to play for Grimsby, including his brothers David and Andy, his father Roy and his uncle Norman.

Illness and death
In January 2010, it was reported that Moore was suffering from Pick's disease, a rare form of dementia, and in need of 24-hour care. To support his care, his former club Southampton organised a charity golf day, while another of his former clubs, Grimsby, played a benefit match to provide for Moore's care. He died on his 55th birthday, 29 April 2013, in Hedge End, Hampshire.

Career statistics

Honours
Grimsby Town
Division Three champions: 1980
Football League Group Trophy winner: 1982

Southampton
Full Members Cup finalist: 1992

References

External links
Grimsby Town Official Site – Past player profile

Obituary on Southampton FC website

1958 births
2013 deaths
Footballers from Grimsby
English footballers
Association football defenders
Grimsby Town F.C. players
Oldham Athletic A.F.C. players
Southampton F.C. players
Bristol Rovers F.C. players
Fulham F.C. players
Premier League players
Deaths from Pick's disease
Deaths from dementia in England